Polyplax is a genus of lice belonging to the family Polyplacidae.

The genus has cosmopolitan distribution.

Species:

Polyplax abyssinica 
Polyplax acomydis 
Polyplax alaskensis 
Polyplax antennata 
Polyplax arvicanthis 
Polyplax asiatica 
Polyplax auricularis 
Polyplax biseriata 
Polyplax blanfordi 
Polyplax borealis 
Polyplax brachyrrhyncha 
Polyplax brachyuromyis 
Polyplax bullimae 
Polyplax bureschi 
Polyplax calomysci 
Polyplax caluri 
Polyplax cannomydis 
Polyplax chinensis 
Polyplax cummingsi 
Polyplax cutchicus 
Polyplax dacnomydi 
Polyplax dacnomydis 
Polyplax dentaticornis 
Polyplax deomydis 
Polyplax dolichura 
Polyplax ellobii 
Polyplax eropepli 
Polyplax expressa 
Polyplax gerbilli 
Polyplax gracilis 
Polyplax grammomydis 
Polyplax grammomys 
Polyplax guatemalensis 
Polyplax hannswrangeli 
Polyplax hoogstraali 
Polyplax hopkinsi 
Polyplax humae 
Polyplax hurrianicus 
Polyplax indica 
Polyplax insulsa 
Polyplax jonesi 
Polyplax kaiseri 
Polyplax kondana 
Polyplax longus 
Polyplax melasmothrixi 
Polyplax meridionalis 
Polyplax miacantha 
Polyplax myotomydis 
Polyplax nesomydis 
Polyplax opimi 
Polyplax otomydis 
Polyplax oxyrrhyncha 
Polyplax paradoxa 
Polyplax parataterae 
Polyplax phloemydis 
Polyplax phloeomydis 
Polyplax phthisica 
Polyplax plesia 
Polyplax praecisa 
Polyplax praomydis 
Polyplax pricei 
Polyplax qiuae 
Polyplax reclinata 
Polyplax rhizomydis 
Polyplax roseinnesi 
Polyplax serrata 
Polyplax sindensis 
Polyplax smallwoodae 
Polyplax solivaga 
Polyplax spinigera 
Polyplax spinulosa 
Polyplax steatomydis 
Polyplax stephensi 
Polyplax subtaterae 
Polyplax tarsomydis 
Polyplax taterae 
Polyplax thamnomydis 
Polyplax vacillata 
Polyplax vicina 
Polyplax visenda 
Polyplax wallacei 
Polyplax waterstoni 
Polyplax werneri

References

Polyplacidae